This list contains the mobile country codes and mobile network codes for networks with country codes between 300 and 399, inclusively – a region that covers North America and the Caribbean. Guam and the Northern Mariana Islands are included in this region as parts of the United States.

National operators

A

Anguilla (United Kingdom) – AI

Antigua and Barbuda – AG

Aruba (Kingdom of the Netherlands) – AW

B

Bahamas – BS

Barbados – BB

Bermuda – BM

British Virgin Islands (United Kingdom) – VG

C

Canada – CA

Cayman Islands (United Kingdom) – KY

Cuba – CU

D

Dominica – DM

Dominican Republic – DO

F

French Antilles (France) – BL/GF/GP/MF/MQ 
includes 
French Guiana (France) – GF
Guadeloupe (France) – GP
Martinique (France) – MQ
Saint Barthélemy (France) – BL
Saint Martin (France) – MF

G

Grenada – GD

Guam (United States of America) – GU

H

Haiti – HT

J

Jamaica – JM

M

Mexico – MX

Montserrat (United Kingdom) – MS

N

Former Netherlands Antilles (Kingdom of the Netherlands) – BQ/CW/SX 
includes 
 Bonaire, Saba, Sint Eustatius (Kingdom of the Netherlands) – BQ
 Curaçao (Kingdom of the Netherlands) – CW
 Sint Maarten – SX

Northern Mariana Islands (United States of America) – MP

P

Puerto Rico – PR

S

Saint Kitts and Nevis – KN

Saint Lucia – LC

Saint Pierre and Miquelon (France) – PM

Saint Vincent and the Grenadines – VC

T

Trinidad and Tobago – TT

Turks and Caicos Islands – TC

U

United States of America – US

United States Virgin Islands (United States of America) – VI

See also
 List of mobile network operators of the Americas
 List of LTE networks in the Americas

References

Telecommunications lists
North America-related lists